T. G. Ravindranathan (born 16 May 1944), popularly known as T. G. Ravi, is an Indian actor, mainly noted for his roles as a villain in Malayalam cinema. He along with Balan K. Nair played most of the negative roles in Malayalam cinema during the 1970s and 1980s. Known for his body language and style of dialogue delivery, he played some of the biggest villain roles in Malayalam cinema during that period.

Early life and family

T.G. Ravi was born on 16 May 1944, in an, Ezhuthachan family in Moorkanikkara village, Thrissur, in present-day Kerala, India. After the completion of pre-degree from St. Thomas College, Thrissur, he chose to pursue a career in engineering and undertook his degree course through University of Kerala in Government Engineering College, Thrissur. He graduated in mechanical engineering in 1969. Apart from involving in theatre arts, he also represented the University of Kerala in Football and Hockey. He was an artist at The All India Radio where he met Thikkodiyan, who was instrumental in introducing him to the silver screen.

Acting career

Ravi began acting in the plays put up by the young men in his village, Moorkkanikkara, in Thrissur district. He also started acting in professional drama. Radio plays were popular in those days. Thikkodiyan introduced Ravi to Aravindan, a highly acclaimed Malayalam Director, which fetched him his first role in Uttarayanam.

But he didn't get any offers to act after that, so he produced a film himself, Paadasaram, in which he was, predictably, the hero. It flopped at the box office, but the next two films he produced, Chora Chuvanna Chora and Chakara, did better. The role of Shaji in Chakara opposite Jayan established him as a villain.

Among those who noticed him was director Bharathan. He cast Ravi in the role of Kunjippalu in Parankimala. The villain who spoke in the Thrissur dialect proved to be the turning point in his career. After Parankimala, as Ravi starred in many hits, including Ee Nadu, Iniyenkilum, Pathamudayam, 1921, NH 47, and Pavam Krooran.

He quit acting when he was at his peak, as one of the dreaded villains of Malayalam cinema in the late 1980s. T. G. Ravi is now active again as an actor, after a break. He restarted his career with Sibi Malayil's venture Amrutham in 2005, and then made noted performances in Pakal, Cycle, Romans, Jacobinte Swargarajyam, Georgettans Pooram, Red Wine, and The Priest.

Personal life
He is a noted industrialist and has been instrumental in developing Thrissur as a major base for the rubber industries. He is the Managing Director of Suntec Tyres Limited. He has also served as the president of The Cochin Devaswom Board which controls the affairs of over 400 temples in Ernakulam, Thrissur and Palakkad districts.

He was married to (late) Dr. V. K. Subhadra, a retired government servant. He has two children: Ranjith, an alumnus of Indian Institute of Management Calcutta and London Business School and Sreejith Ravi, Malayalm film actor. Seema and Sajitha are his daughters-in-law. Milit, Rijrashwa, Mitul and Ritunjay are his grandsons and Minal is his granddaughter.

T. G. Ravi was the president of All Kerala Ezhuthachan Samajam.

Filmography

As an actor

 Uttarayanam (1974)
 Padasaram (1978) as Ravi
 Brashtu (1978)
 Chaakara (1980) as Shaji
 Chora Chuvanna Chora (1980)
 Parankimala (1981)
 Vayal (1981) as Vaasu
 Arayannam (1981) as Captain Rajan
 Kodumudikal (1981) as Das
 Chatta (1981) as Manikyan
 Kadathu (1981) as Kala Dhamodharan
 Ahimsa (1981)
 Attimari (1981) as Ram Singh/Venu
 Greeshma Jwala (1981) as Kariyachan
 Idiyum Minnalum (1982)
 Ee Nadu (1982) as Karunakaran
 Koritharicha Naal(1982) as Ravi
 Mattuvin Chattangale (1982)
 Innallenkil Naale (1982)
 Jambulingam (1982)
 Amrutha Geetham (1982) as Gopalan
 Aakrosham (1982)
 Balloon (1982)
 Post Mortem (1982) as Chackochan
 Kolakomban (1983)
Aadhipathyam (1983) as Rajendran
 Deepaaradhana (1983)
 Iniyengilum (1983) as Madhavan
 Passport (1983) as Raghavan
 Oru Mukham Pala Mukham (1983)
 Rugma (1983)
 Aattakkalasham (1983)
 Sandhya Mayangum Neram (1984) as Ramu
 Mortuary (1983)
 Mahaabali (1983)
 Vikatakavi (1984)
 Thirakil Alppam Samayam (1984)
 Makale Mappu Tharu (1984)
 Vetta (1984)
 Karimbu (1984)
 Oru Thettinde Kadha (1984)
 Kurishuyudham (1984) as Issac John
 Aagraham(1984)
 NH47 (1984) as Sudhakara Kurup
 Unaru (1984)
 Ivide Ingane (1984) as Chandrasekharan
 Paavam Krooran (1984) as Dhamodharan
 Oru Kochukatha Aarum Parayatha Katha (1984) as Shanku
 Poomadathu Pennu (1984) as Kochaniyan
 Rajavembala (1984)
 Nethavu (1984)
 Kodathi (1984) as Divakaran
 Attuvanch Ulanjappol (1984)
 Oru Kochu Karyam (1985)
 Choodatha Pokkal(1985) as Warior
 Sannaaham (1985)
 Uyarthezhunelppu (1985)
 Akkachiyude kunjuvava (1985)
 Nerariyum Nerathu (1985)
 Scene No 7 (1985)
 Shantham Bheekaram (1985)
 Angadikkappurathu (1985) as Alex
 Ee Thanalil Ithiri Neram (1985)
 Ee Lokam Ivide Kure Manushyar (1985) as Keshu
 Ithu Nalla Thamasha (1985) as Ouseph
 Nullu Novikkathe (1985)
 Jeevante Jeevan (1985)
 Snehicha Kuttathinu (1985)
 7-9 Vare (1985)
 Mukhya Manthri(1985)
 Nayakan (1985) as Murugan
 Pathaamudayam ( 1985)
 Uyarum Njan Nadake (1985)
 Manya Mahajanangale (1985)
 Makan Ente Makan (1985)
 Ardha Raathri (1986)
 Shobharaj (1986)
 Onnu Randu Moonnu (1986)
 Atham Chithira Chothi (1986) as Fernandez
 Ente Shadbam (1986) as Maheshwaran Thampi
 Annoru Ravil (1986)
 Ente Sonia (1986)
 Padayani (1986)
 Karinaagam (1986)
 Vartha (1986)
 Chilampu (1986) as Shankunni
 Vamban (1987)
 Theekattu (1987) as Ramadas
 Kottum Kuravayum (1987)
 Naalkkavala (1987)
 Neeyallengil Njan (1987) as Das
 Jungle Boy (1987) as Forest Officer
 PC 369 (1987)
 Kurukkan Rajavayi (1987)
 Ithrayum Kalam (1987) as Paili
 Rahsyam Parama Rahasyam (1988) as Sudhakaran
 Bheekaran(1988) as Vishwam
 Agnichirakulla Thumbi (1988)
 Onnum Onnum Pathinonnu (1988)
 Anuragi (1988) as Samu's Appachan
 Abkari (1988)
 1921 (1988) as Variam Kunnath Kunhammad Haji
 V I P(1989) as Shivadasan
 Aval Oru Sindhu (1989)
 Prabhaatham Chuvanna Theruvil(1989)
 Kodungallur Bhagavathy (1989)
 Niyamam Enthu Cheyyum (1990)
 Sadhayam (1992)
 Bhoomi Geetham(1993)
 Dhruvam (1993)
 Avan Ananthapadmanaabhan (1994)
 Nerariyum Nerathu (1985)
 Amrutham (2004)
 Lokanathan IAS (2005) as Pappan
 Vaasthavam
 Rasathanthram (2006)
 Achanurangatha Veedu (2006)
 Oruvan  (2006) as Vilagannnur Ashan
 Karutha  (2006)
 Pakal (2006) as Joseph
 Chandranilekkoru Vazhi (2006)
 Ashwaroodan (2006) as Kanara Panikkar
 Prajapathi (2006) as Velappan Mooshari
 Paradesi (2007)
 Ali Bhai (2007) as Narayanan
 Anamika (2007)
 Abraham And Lincoln (2007) as Kottara Mathen
 Ottakkayyan (2007)
 Sketch (2007) as Koyakka
 Adayalangal (2008)
 Cycle (2008)
 Thaavalam (2008)
 Mayabazar(2008) as Jose
 Adayaalangal (2008)
 Chandranilekkoru Vazhi (2008) as Nexelate Vijayan
 Positive (2008)
 Jaanaki(2009)
 Chattambinadu (2009)
 Winter (2009)
 Shudharil Shudhan (2009) as Patta Krishnan
 Valiyangadi (2010)
 Pakida Pakida Panthrandu (2011)
 Cocoon (2011)
 Aattakadha (2011)
 Naale (2011)
 Maharaja Talkies (2011)
 Aakashathinte Niram (2011)
 Pranchiyettan & the Saint (2010)
 Thiruvambadi Thamban (2012)
 22 Female Kottayam (2012)
 Isaac Newton S/O Philipose (2013)
 Romans (2013)
 Lucky Star (2013)
 Celluloid (2013)
 Lokpal (2013)
 Red Wine (2013) as Narayanan
 Buddy (2013) 
 Punyalan Agarbattis (2013)
Gangster (2014)
Varsha (2014)
Iyobinte Pusthakam (2014) as Narrator/An Old Comrade
Utopiayile Rajavu (2015)
Ayal Njanalla (2015)
Su Su Sudhi Vathmeekam (2015)
Jacobinte Swargarajyam (2016)
Georgettan's Pooram (2017)
Thrissivaperoor Kliptham (2017)
Porinju Mariam Jose (2019) as Anthony
Thrissur Pooram (2019) as Vettoly Balan
 Mohan Kumar Fans (2021) as Ravi
 The Priest (2021) as Dr. Mathews 
 Bheeshma Parvam (2022) as Simon Pappan
 Pada (2022) as mediator
 Kooman (2022) 
 Malikappuram (2022) 
 Aanaparambile World Cup (2022) 
 Jaladhara Pump Set Since 1962 (2023)

As a producer
 Padasaram (1979)
 Chora Chuvanna Chora (1980)
 Chaakara (1980)

Accolades
 2007 : Kerala State Film Award – Special Mention (Films - Adayalangal, Ottakkayyan)
 Kerala State Government Television Award 2006 - Best Actor - Nizhalroopam
 2013 : Kerala Film Critics Association Awards - Chalachitra Prathiba Puraskar

References

External links

 
 T G Ravi at MSI

Indian male film actors
Male actors from Thrissur
Living people
Kerala State Film Award winners
1944 births
Male actors in Malayalam cinema
Government Engineering College, Thrissur alumni
20th-century Indian male actors
21st-century Indian male actors
Malayalam film producers
Film producers from Thrissur